St. John's High School (SJHS) is a senior high school in Charleston, South Carolina, on Johns Island. It is a part of the Charleston County School District. St. John's is home to approximately 300 students and 30 faculty and staff.

St. John's offers Advanced Placement and dual credit courses totaling over 30 hours of offered college credit, as well as three career academies in Hospitality and Tourism, Computer Science, and Culinary Arts.

The school's athletic teams are known as the Mighty Islanders, and royal blue and maroon are the school colors. St. John's competes at the A level in football, volleyball, basketball (boys' and girls'), wrestling, soccer, track, baseball, and softball. The Islanders also offer marching band, agriculture and green house, weightlifting, competitive academic team, and student council.

References

External links
St. John's High School

Public high schools in South Carolina
Schools in Charleston County, South Carolina
Education in Charleston, South Carolina